Alfredo Rivera may refer to:

 A fictional air crew member, performed by comedian The Real Spark
 A senior executive, employed by The Coca-Cola Company